Red=Luck is singer-songwriter Patty Larkin's tenth album. Produced by Larkin, Bette Warner, and Ben Wittman in 2003 and distributed by Vanguard Records, it contained the following songs:

Track listing

 "All That Innocence"
 "24/7/365"
 "The Cranes"
 "Children"
 "Italian Shoes"
 "Birmingham"
 "Too Bad"
 "Home"
 "Different World"
 "Normal"
 "Red=Luck"
 "Inside Your Painting"
 "St. Augustine"
 "Louder"

All songs were written by Patty Larkin.

Album personnel
 Patty Larkin - vocals, acoustic guitar, harmonica, backing vocals
 Ben Wittman - drums
 Richard Gates - bass
 Mike Rivard - sintir
 John Hickey - electric guitar
 Marc Shulman - electric guitar
 Duke Levine - electric guitar
 Jeff Lang - slide guitar
 Seamus Egan - low flute and mandolin
 Mick McAuley - button accordion
 Winifred Horan - fiddle
 Merrie Amsterburg - backing vocals
 Jonatha Brooke - backing vocals
 Bette Warner - talking
 Tim Craven - electric guitar
 Gideon Freudmann - cello
 Jennifer Kimball - backing vocals
 Willy Porter - backing vocals, thumb piano

References

Patty Larkin albums
2003 albums
Vanguard Records albums